"Crushed Up" is a song by American rapper Future, released on January 4, 2019 as the lead single from his seventh studio album The Wizrd, which was released two weeks later. The song was produced by Wheezy, Matt Cap and Ricky Racks, all three of whom co-wrote the song with Future. The song finds Future singing about his luxurious lifestyle, especially regarding jewelry and diamonds.

Critical reception
The song was met with generally positive reviews. Karlton Jahmal of HotNewHipHop wrote that the song "sounds polished to perfection", adding, "His vocals are mixed immaculately over calming synths. The kicks on the instrumental will cause you to nod your head the moment they drop and the addicting chorus is already stuck in my head."

Billboard magazine ranked it 71st on their list of the 100 Best Songs of 2019, calling it his "mightiest 2019 single".

Music video
The music video was uploaded on YouTube the day before the single was released. It was directed by Spike Jordan and Sebastian Sduigui. The video begins with a boy entering an "alternate universe of winter wonderland". The setting then shifts to that of a mansion, with snow falling from the ceiling. Future walks through the mansion in various outfits, followed by ballerinas and "some creepy crawlers like tarantulas and scorpions".

Live performances
In January 2019, Future performed the song at The Late Show with Stephen Colbert and The Ellen DeGeneres Show.

Charts

Certifications

In popular culture
The song is featured in the episode "It's Summer and We're Running Out of Ice" of Watchmen.

References

2019 singles
2019 songs
Future (rapper) songs
Songs written by Future (rapper)
Song recordings produced by Wheezy (record producer)
Songs written by Wheezy (record producer)